Sara Mitchell (born October 21, 1949) is an American writer and novelist. Her historical novel, Virginia Autumn was a winner of the Maggie Award and a Christy Award finalist.

References

External links
 Official Website

1949 births
Living people
American women novelists
Place of birth missing (living people)
21st-century American women